Blastobasis aphilodes is a moth in the  family Blastobasidae. It was described by Edward Meyrick in 1918. It is found in Colombia.

References

Natural History Museum Lepidoptera generic names catalog

Blastobasis
Moths described in 1918
Moths of South America
Taxa named by Edward Meyrick